Yevhen Plyuta ( or Evgeni Pliuta from , born 30 June 1974) is a Ukrainian former competitive figure skater. He is the 1993 World Junior champion. His best results at senior ISU Championships were ninth at the 1998 World Championships and seventh at the 1999 European Championships.

Programs

Results
GP: Champions Series (Grand Prix)

References

Navigation

1974 births
Ukrainian male single skaters
Living people
World Junior Figure Skating Championships medalists
Sportspeople from Kyiv